The Polish Academy Award for Best Film Screenplay is an annual award given to the best Polish screenplay of the year.

Winners and nominees

References

External links
 Polish Film Awards; Official website 

Polish film awards
Awards established in 1999
1999 establishments in Poland